Ceratostigma willmottianum, Chinese plumbago, is a species of flowering plant in the family Plumbaginaceae that is native to western China and Tibet. It is an ornamental deciduous shrub that grows to 1 metre in height, with pale blue plumbago-like flowers appearing in autumn as the leaves start to turn red.

Etymology
Ceratostigma is derived from Greek, meaning 'horned stigma’. This is in reference to the ‘shape of the stigmatic surface’.

The specific epithet willmottianum was named for Miss Ellen Ann Willmott (1858-1934), a keen gardener and plant introducer from Warley Place, Essex, UK.

Cultivation
Ceratostigma willmottianum is cultivated as a garden plant, valued for its late season red leaves and rich blue flowers. Both the species and the cultivar  = 'Lice' have gained the Royal Horticultural Society's Award of Garden Merit. There is also a cultivar with yellow foliage,  = 'Palmgold'.

References

willmottianum
Flora of China
Flora of Tibet